Frost free can refer to any of the following:
 Auto-defrost, a technique for refrigerators;
 A climate that is free of frost
 Certain bibcocks (sillcocks);
 The Frost Free Library in Marlborough, New Hampshire